The Ambassador of Australia to the Netherlands is an officer of the Australian Department of Foreign Affairs and Trade and the head of the Embassy of the Commonwealth of Australia to the Kingdom of the Netherlands. The Ambassador resides in The Hague. The current ambassador, since August 2018, is Matthew Neuhaus.

List of heads of mission

: Non-resident minister; served concurrently as Australian High Commissioner to the United Kingdom.
: Tate served concurrently as the Australian Ambassador to the Holy See.

References

 
Netherlands
Australia